Seyyed Sharif (also Romanized as Seyyed Sharīf; also known as Kūt-e Seyyed Sharīf) is a village in Veys Rural District, Veys District, Bavi County, Khuzestan Province, Iran. At the 2006 census, its population was 431, in 67 families.

References 

Populated places in Bavi County